Teymuraz Gabashvili was the defending champion, but decided not to defend his title.

Radu Albot won the title after defeating Konstantin Kravchuk 6–4, 6–2 in the final.

Seeds

Draw

Finals

Top half

Bottom half

References
 Main Draw
 Qualifying Draw

Fergana Challenger - Singles
2016 Men's Singles